Tagaryū Shōji (Japanese: 多賀竜 昇司, born February 15, 1958) is a former sumo wrestler from Hitachi, Ibaraki Prefecture, Japan. The highest rank he reached was sekiwake. In 1984 he won a top division yūshō or tournament championship from the maegashira ranking. He is now a sumo coach and head of the Kagamiyama stable as well as a director of the Japan Sumo Association.

Career
Tagaryū  made his professional debut in March 1974. It took him seven years to make the sekitori ranks, his promotion to the second highest jūryō division coming in January 1981. He reached the top makuuchi division in May 1982. He made his san'yaku debut at sekiwake rank in November 1983 but lasted only one tournament there and fell back to the maegashira ranks.

September 1984 Championship
At the September 1984 tournament, the last to be held at the Kuramae Kokugikan, Tagaryū was ranked maegashira 12 and knew that another make-koshi would leave him in danger of demotion from makuuchi altogether. Tagaryū started excellently, and the end of the middle day saw him the only wrestler with an eight-win clean sheet. Ōzeki Wakashimazu, who had won the previous tournament 15–0, had only lost one bout thus far. Tagaryū lost to maegashira Tochitsurugi on the ninth day. Wakashimazu lost to Konishiki on the eleventh day, leaving him with two losses. The penultimate day saw Tagaryū, with one loss, drawn against Wakashimazu with two. Tagaryū defeated the ōzeki by yoritaoshi, eliminating him from the title race. Tagaryū now stood on 13–1, one win ahead of Konishiki on 12–2. When Konishiki fell to Kotokaze on the final day, Tagaryū's subsequent loss to Asashio was immaterial. With thirteen wins and two losses, he was the tournament champion. He was the first winner from the maegashira ranks since Kaiketsu in 1976. In addition to the Emperor's Cup, he was awarded the Technique Prize and the Fighting Spirit Prize.

Later career
Following his tournament win Tagaryū  was promoted to komusubi but turned in a losing score and was demoted. In the January 1985 tournament he defeated yokozuna Kitanoumi in what was the latter's last ever bout. This was to be Tagaryū's only kinboshi.  After a series of unimpressive results he was demoted back to the jūryō division in July 1988 and promptly won the jūryō championship. He thereby became the second person (after Wakanami) to accomplish the somewhat dubious feat of capturing the tournament championship in the second division after winning it in the first. He retired in May 1991.

Fighting style
Tagaryū preferred yotsu-sumo, or grappling techniques. His favoured grip on the opponent's mawashi was migi-yotsu, a left hand outside, right hand inside position. He also liked uwatenage, or overarm throw, and uwatedashinage, or pulling overarm throw. His most common winning kimarite was yori-kiri, the force out, used in about 40 percent of his victories.

After retirement
Tagaryū has remained in the sumo world as an elder of the Japan Sumo Association. He became head coach of Kagamiyama stable in 1996 upon the death of his old coach in his days as an active wrestler, former yokozuna Kashiwado. His son Shōta, born in 1986, is a wrestler at the stable under the ring name Ryūsei, although he has not got higher than the makushita division. The only other wrestler in the stable is the former maegashira Kagamiō. In February 2010 Kagamiyama was elected to the Sumo Association's board of Directors and he also serves as a ringside judge. In March 2021 he stood down from his roles as head of compliance and head of crisis management due to ill-health.

Career record

See also
Glossary of sumo terms
List of sumo elders
List of sumo tournament top division champions
List of sumo tournament second division champions
List of past sumo wrestlers
List of sekiwake

References

External links
 Tagaryū's basho results
 complete biography and basho results (Japanese)

1958 births
Living people
Japanese sumo wrestlers
People from Hitachi, Ibaraki
Sumo people from Ibaraki Prefecture
Sekiwake